Christoffer Wiktorsson (born 22 March 1989) is a Swedish footballer who plays as a defender.

References

External links

1989 births
Living people
Association football defenders
Degerfors IF players
Örebro SK players
Superettan players
Allsvenskan players
Swedish footballers
Sweden youth international footballers